In Major League Baseball (MLB), the 3,000 strikeout club is the group of 19 pitchers who have struck out 3,000 or more batters in their careers. Walter Johnson became the first member in 1923, and was the only one until Bob Gibson joined in 1974. The most recent addition is Max Scherzer, who joined on September 12, 2021. The group includes three left-handed pitchers: CC Sabathia, Steve Carlton, and Randy Johnson. Randy Johnson reached the mark with the fewest games pitched and innings pitched. The Minnesota Twins were the first of four franchises to see multiple pitchers record their 3,000th strikeout: Walter Johnson (while the franchise was called the Washington Senators) in 1923 and Bert Blyleven in 1986. The other teams with multiple members are the Chicago Cubs (Ferguson Jenkins and Greg Maddux), the New York Yankees (Phil Niekro and Sabathia), and the Houston Astros (Nolan Ryan and Justin Verlander). César Gerónimo is the only player struck out by two pitchers for their 3,000th strikeout: Gibson in 1974 and Ryan in 1980. Ten 3,000-strikeout pitchers are also members of the 300-win club.  Seven members were named to the All-Century Team, a list of MLB's best 100 players; fans later elected four of them as starters.

The club is considered to almost be a guarantee of entry into the National Baseball Hall of Fame. Fourteen members of the 3,000-strikeout club have been elected to the Hall, most recently Randy Johnson, Pedro Martínez, and John Smoltz, all voted in during the 2015 balloting. Three more members - Sabathia, Scherzer, and Verlander - are not yet eligible for election, being neither dead for six months nor retired for five seasons. The remaining two, Roger Clemens and Curt Schilling, made their first appearances on the ballot for the  elections and received about half of the total votes needed for induction before falling off the ballot in 2022. Clemens' future election is seen as uncertain because of his alleged links to use of performance-enhancing drugs.

Key

Club members

See also

List of Major League Baseball career strikeout leaders
300 win club

References
General

Specific

Strikeouts
Major League Baseball statistics